Krasnoye Selo is the name of several inhabited localities in Russia.

Modern localities
Urban localities
Krasnoye Selo, a municipal town in Krasnoselsky District of the federal city of St. Petersburg

Rural localities
Krasnoye Selo, Arkhangelsk Oblast, a village in Lomonosovsky Selsoviet of Kholmogorsky District in Arkhangelsk Oblast; 
Krasnoye Selo, Kaliningrad Oblast, a settlement under the administrative jurisdiction of the town of district significance of Neman in Nemansky District of Kaliningrad Oblast
Krasnoye Selo, Moscow Oblast, a village in Seredinskoye Rural Settlement of Shakhovskoy District in Moscow Oblast; 
Krasnoye Selo, Vologda Oblast, a village in Pogossky Selsoviet of Kichmengsko-Gorodetsky District in Vologda Oblast

Alternative names
Krasnoye Selo, alternative name of Krasnoselsk, a selo in Ynyrginskoye Rural Settlement of Choysky District in the Altai Republic; 
Krasnoye Selo, alternative name of Krasnoye, a selo in Kharikolinsky Selsoviet of Khunzakhsky District in the Republic of Dagestan; 
Krasnoye selo, alternative name of Iki-Bukhus, a settlement in Iki-Bukhusovskaya Rural Administration of Maloderbetovsky District in the Republic of Kalmykia; 
Krasnoye Selo, alternative name of Krasnoye, a selo in Chanovsky District of Novosibirsk Oblast;

See also
Krasnoselsky (inhabited locality)